Lost in Paradise may refer to:

Music
 Lost in Paradise (X-Perience album), 2006
 Lost in Paradise (Faber Drive album), 2012
 Lost In Paradise, a 2017 album by Common Kings
 Lost in Paradise, a 2002 album by Armik
 "Lost in Paradise" (song), a 2011 song by Evanescence
 "Lost in Paradise", a 2012 song by Rihanna from Unapologetic
 "Lost in Paradise", a 2020 song by ALI featuring rapper AKLO

Other uses
 Lost in Paradise (film), a 2011 Vietnamese film
 Lost in Paradise, a 2015 novel by Mikael Torfason